Stephen Henley Locher (born 1978) is an American lawyer who serves as a United States district judge of the United States District Court for the Southern District of Iowa. He was formerly a United States magistrate judge of the same court.

Education 

Locher's hometown is Mason City, Iowa.  He received his Bachelor of Arts from the University of Notre Dame, magna cum laude, in 2000 and his Juris Doctor from Harvard Law School in 2003. During law school, he taught economics at Harvard University.

Legal career 

Locher served as a law clerk for Judge John R. Gibson of the United States Court of Appeals for the Eighth Circuit from 2003 to 2004. From 2004 to 2008, he was an associate at Goldberg Kohn in Chicago, where he specialized in commercial law. From 2008 to 2013, he was an Assistant United States Attorney in the U.S. Attorney's Office for the Southern District of Iowa. As a federal prosecutor, he prosecuted pro basketball player Rumeal Robinson for bank fraud and bribery.  He was then a partner at Belin McCormick, P.C., in Des Moines, Iowa from 2013 to 2021, specializing in commercial litigation, white-collar criminal defense, and appeals. At Belin McCormick, his partners included Matthew McDermott. With McDermott, he represented Sholom Rubashkin.

Federal judicial service

United States magistrate judge service 

On December 21, 2020, Locher was selected to serve as a United States magistrate judge. He was sworn in on June 1, 2021.

District court service 

On February 7, 2022, Senators Charles Grassley and Joni Ernst recommended Locher to fill a vacancy on the Southern District of Iowa.  On April 13, 2022, President Joe Biden announced his intent to nominate Locher to serve as a United States district judge of the United States District Court for the Southern District of Iowa. On April 25, 2022, his nomination was sent to the Senate. President Biden nominated Locher to the seat vacated by Judge John Alfred Jarvey, who retired on March 18, 2022. On May 11, 2022, a hearing on his nomination was held before the Senate Judiciary Committee. On June 9, 2022, his nomination was reported out of committee by a voice vote, with Senator Josh Hawley voted "nay" on record. On July 14, 2022, the United States Senate confirmed his nomination by a voice vote. He received his judicial commission on July 18, 2022.

Personal life 

Locher is married to Sarah Crane, a judge of the Iowa District Court, with whom he has four children.

References

External links 
 

1978 births
Living people
21st-century American judges
21st-century American lawyers
Assistant United States Attorneys
Harvard Law School alumni
Illinois lawyers
Iowa lawyers
Judges of the United States District Court for the Southern District of Iowa
People from Mason City, Iowa
United States magistrate judges
United States district court judges appointed by Joe Biden
University of Notre Dame alumni